Cocalico is an unincorporated community located within West Cocalico Township in Lancaster County, Pennsylvania, United States. Cocalico is located at the junction of Pennsylvania Route 897 and Cocalico Road.  The name is said to be derived from an Indian word, "Koch-Hale-Kung", meaning den of snakes.  Snakes were common along the Cocalico Creek.  The name may also be an Anglicization of the French word "coquelicot", meaning poppy.

Notable people
Samuel Bentz, fraktur artist

References

Unincorporated communities in Lancaster County, Pennsylvania
Unincorporated communities in Pennsylvania